There are two places in North Warwickshire called Wood End

Places
 Wood End, Atherstone - Near Kingsbury  
 Wood End, Fillongley, - Near Fillongley

See also
Wood End (disambiguation)